Elvis worms are a group of four species - P. goffrediae, P. mineoi, P. orphanae, and P. elvisi discovered in 2020 with lavender, blue, orange and exoskeleton resembling Elvis Presley jumpsuits. Each species belongs to the genus Peinaleopolynoe.

Reference 

Errantia
Animals described in 2020
Elvis Presley